Salm may refer to

People 
 Constance de Salm (1767–1845), poet and miscellaneous writer; through her second marriage, she became Princess of Salm-Dyck
 Salm ibn Ziyad, an Umayyad governor of Khurasan and Sijistan
 House of Salm, a European formerly ruling family
Salm-Reifferscheid-Raitz

Geography
Salm (state), a historic principality with territories in present Germany, Belgium and France
partitions of the state
Salm-Horstmar
Salm-Kyrburg
Salm-Reifferscheid-Dyck
Salm-Reifferscheid-Hainsbach
Salm-Reifferscheid-Krautheim
Salm-Salm
Salm, Germany, a municipality in Rhineland-Palatinate, Germany
Salm, Chaharmahal and Bakhtiari, Iran
Salm, West Azerbaijan, Iran
Salm Island, an island in Franz Josef Land, Russia

Rivers
 Salm (Moselle), in Germany, tributary to the river Moselle 
 Salm (Amblève), in Belgium, tributary to the river Amblève

Other uses
Salm, the IAU-approved proper name of the star Tau Pegasi
Salm (Shahnameh), a character in Persian epic Shahnameh

SALM
 Suid-Afrikaanse Lugmag, or South African Air Force
 The stock ticker symbol of Salem Communications, a U.S. religious radio broadcaster, Internet content provider, and magazine and book publisher